is an Echizen Railway Mikuni Awara Line railway station located in the city of Sakai, Fukui Prefecture, Japan.

Lines

Station layout
The station consists of one side platform serving a single bi-directional track. There is no station building, but only a shelter on the platform. The station is unstaffed.

Adjacent stations

History
Mikuni-Jinjya Station was opened on July 1, 1930. On September 1, 1942 the Keifuku Electric Railway merged with Mikuni Awara Electric Railway. Operations were halted from June 25, 2001. The station reopened on August 10, 2003 as an Echizen Railway station.

Surrounding area
Central Mikuni stretches from this station to Mikuni-Minato Station. However, most government facilities are clustered around this station. These include:
Kanazawa Regional Taxation Bureau, Mikuni Tax Office
Sakai City Hall, Mikuni Branch Office
Reihoku Fire Department, Reihoku Mikuni Fire Station
Fukui Prefectural Police, Sakai West Police Station
Other points of interest include:
Sakai Municipal Mikuni Hospital
Sakai City Mikuni Junior High School
Sakai City Mikuni South Elementary School
Mikuni Gymnasium

Passenger statistics
In fiscal 2015, the station was used by an average of 72 passengers daily (boarding passengers only).

See also
 List of railway stations in Japan

References

External links

  

Railway stations in Fukui Prefecture
Railway stations in Japan opened in 1930
Mikuni Awara Line
Sakai, Fukui